Elizabeth of Lancaster (bf. 21 February 1363 – 24 November 1426) was the third child of John of Gaunt, 1st Duke of Lancaster, and his first wife Blanche of Lancaster. Elizabeth was made a Lady of the Garter in 1378.

Life
Some sources list her as having been born after 1 January 1363, but prior to 21 February 1363. She was born in Burford, Shropshire. In her childhood, she was raised in her father's royal household under Katherine Swynford, whom she held in high regard. She grew up a headstrong and spirited young woman compared to her more serious elder sister.

Marriages

First marriage
On 24 June 1380, at Kenilworth Castle, she married John Hastings, 3rd Earl of Pembroke. She was seventeen years old and the groom was only eight. She was transferred to another household befitting her new rank as Countess of Pembroke. However, six years later, the marriage between Elizabeth and young Hastings was annulled.

Second marriage
By the age of 23, Elizabeth had tired of her 14-year-old husband. It is said that she had also been seduced by her cousin Richard II of England's half-brother John Holland, a known schemer, and had become pregnant by him. This forced her father to have her marriage annulled, and on 24 June 1386, at Plymouth, she hastily married Holland. Her father dealt with her leniently and favoured his new son-in-law, such was Holland's charm.

Third marriage
Holland, now bearing the title Duke of Exeter, was executed in 1400 for conspiring during the Epiphany Rising against his cousin, Elizabeth's brother Henry IV of England, who had by this time usurped the throne from Richard II. That same year, Elizabeth married Sir John Cornwall, 1st Baron Fanhope and Milbroke.  Her marriage to Sir John caused some scandal, since Sir John failed to ask her brother for permission to marry Elizabeth. This resulted in Sir John's arrest. However, the marriage is said to have been a happy and loving one and they went on to have two children together, Constance and John.

Elizabeth died in 1426 and was buried at St Mary's Church, Burford, Shropshire.

Children
With John Holland she had six children:

Richard Holland, 2nd Earl of Huntingdon (d. 3 September 1400), eldest son and heir, who survived his father only 7 months
Constance Holland (1387–1437) who married Thomas Mowbray, 4th Earl of Norfolk and Sir John Grey and had issue.
Elizabeth Holland (c. 1389 – 18 November 1449); who married Sir Roger Fiennes and had issue.
Alice Holland (c. 1392 – c. 1406) who married Richard de Vere, 11th Earl of Oxford; had no issue.
John Holland, 2nd Duke of Exeter (1395–1447); had issue.
Sir Edward Holland (1399–1413); had no issue.

With John Cornwall, 1st Baron Fanhope and Milbroke she had two children:

Constance Cornwall (c. 1401 – c. 1427) who married John Fitzalan, 14th Earl of Arundel, but had no issue.
Sir John Cornwall (c. 1404 – 2 May 1422) was only seventeen when, in his father's presence, his head was blown off by a gun-stone at the Siege of Meaux. He had no issue.

References

Further reading
Oxford Dictionary of National Biography (online resource) 2004–2007. (Print version: Oxford dictionary of national biography : in association with the British Academy : from the earliest times to the year 2000 / edited by H.C.G. Matthew and Brian Harrison.) Article on "Elizabeth of Lancaster" by Anthony Goodman.

1364 births
1426 deaths
House of Lancaster
Daughters of English dukes
Pembroke
Exeter
Wives of knights
Elizabeth of Lancaster, Duchess of Exeter
Holland family
14th-century English nobility
14th-century English women
15th-century English nobility
15th-century English women
Ladies of the Garter